Roperi is a large village in the Tehsil Kharian, in District Gujrat, Province  of Punjab, It is situated approximately five kilometres east of Kotla. Roperi is 38 kilometres away from Gujarat District and about 30 kilometres away from Kharian Tehsil. The Union Council of Roperi, Aach-Goch, is 3 kilometres to the north. The border of Azad Kashmir is 10 kilometres north of Roperi. Most of the people in this village are Jutt/Malik. The main source of income for the villagers comes from agriculture, dairy production, and small locally owned businesses.

References

Villages in Gujrat District